On March 10, 1956 A B-47 Stratojet carrying nuclear weapons material disappeared over the Mediterranean Sea.

Flight
A Boeing B-47 Stratojet, call-sign Inkspot 59, (306th Bombardment Wing/369th Bomb Squadron) took off from MacDill Air Force Base, Florida, in the United States for a non-stop flight to Ben Guerir Air Base, Morocco, and completed the first of two planned aerial refuelings without incident.

The unarmed aircraft was transporting two capsules of nuclear weapons material in carrying cases; a nuclear detonation was not possible.

Aftermath

A French news agency reported that the plane had exploded in the air southeast of Saïdia, in French Morocco in the same general location of its last known position. After an exhaustive search, no remains of the device could be located, and the exact place of its disappearance was never established.

The crew was declared dead:
 Captain Robert H. Hodgin, 31, aircraft commander 
 Captain Gordon M. Insley, 32, observer 
 2nd Lt. Ronald L. Kurtz, 22, pilot

See also
 List of people who disappeared mysteriously at sea

References

1950s missing person cases
1956 in the United States
Accidents and incidents involving United States Air Force aircraft
B-47 disappearance
Aviation accidents and incidents in the Mediterranean Sea
Aviation accidents and incidents involving nuclear weapons
March 1956 events in Europe
Missing aircraft
People lost at sea